|}

The Cheveley Park Stakes is a Group 1 flat horse race in Great Britain open to two-year-old fillies. It is run on the Rowley Mile at Newmarket over a distance of 6 furlongs (1,207 metres), and it is scheduled to take place each year in late September.

History
The event is named after Cheveley Park, an estate purchased by Harry McCalmont in 1892. It was established in 1899, and the inaugural running was won by Lutetia.

The race is currently held on the final day of Newmarket's three-day Cambridgeshire Meeting, the same day as the Cambridgeshire Handicap.

The leading horses from the Cheveley Park Stakes often go on to compete in the following season's 1,000 Guineas. The first to win both was Pretty Polly (1903–04), and the most recent was Special Duty (2009–10).

Records
Leading jockey (9 wins):
 Sir Gordon Richards – Tiffin (1928), Keystone (1940), Lady Sybil (1942), Neolight (1945), Pambidian (1948), Belle of All (1950), Zabara (1951), Bebe Grande (1952), Sixpence (1953)

Leading trainer (4 wins):
 Alec Taylor, Jr. – Maid of the Mist (1908), Maid of Corinth (1909), Bayuda (1918), Miss Gadabout (1924)
 Criquette Head-Maarek – Ma Biche (1982), Ravinella (1987), Pas de Reponse (1996), Special Duty (2009)

Leading owner (4 wins):
 Robert Sangster – Durtal (1976), Sookera (1977), Woodstream (1981), Capricciosa (1990)

Winners since 1971

Earlier winners

 1899: Lutetia
 1900: Alruna
 1901: Punctilio
 1902: Skyscraper
 1903: Pretty Polly
 1904: Galantine
 1905: Colonia
 1906: Witch Elm
 1907: Bracelet
 1908: Maid of the Mist
 1909: Maid of Corinth
 1910: Knockfeerna
 1911: Belleisle
 1912: Merula
 1913: Shake Down
 1914: Lady of Asia
 1915: Fifinella
 1916: Molly Desmond
 1917: Freesia
 1918: Bayuda
 1919: Bright Folly
 1920: Romana
 1921: Selene
 1922: Paola
 1923: Chronometer
 1924: Miss Gadabout
 1925: Karra
 1926: Nipisiquit
 1927: Scuttle
 1928: Tiffin
 1929: Merry Wife
 1930: The Leopard
 1931: Concordia
 1932: Brown Betty
 1933: Light Brocade
 1934: Lady Gabrial
 1935: Ferrybridge
 1936: Celestial Way
 1937: Stafaralla
 1938: Seaway
 1939: no race
 1940: Keystone
 1941: Perfect Peace
 1942: Lady Sybil
 1943: Fair Fame
 1944: Sweet Cygnet
 1945: Neolight
 1946: Djerba
 1947: Ash Blonde
 1948: Pambidian
 1949: Corejada
 1950: Belle of All
 1951: Zabara
 1952: Bebe Grande
 1953: Sixpence
 1954: Gloria Nicky
 1955: Midget
 1956: Sarcelle
 1957: Rich and Rare
 1958: Lindsay
 1959: Queensberry
 1960: Opaline
 1961: Display
 1962: My Goodness Me
 1963: Crimea II
 1964: Night Off
 1965: Berkeley Springs
 1966: Fleet
 1967: Lalibela
 1968: Mige
 1969: Humble Duty
 1970: Magic Flute

See also
 Horse racing in Great Britain
 List of British flat horse races

References
 Paris-Turf: 
 Racing Post:

 galopp-sieger.de – Cheveley Park Stakes.
 ihfaonline.org – International Federation of Horseracing Authorities – Cheveley Park Stakes (2019).
 pedigreequery.com – Cheveley Park Stakes – Newmarket.
 

Flat races in Great Britain
Newmarket Racecourse
Flat horse races for two-year-old fillies
Recurring sporting events established in 1899
1899 establishments in England